The Kingdom of Yugoslavia competed at the 1936 Summer Olympics in Berlin, Germany. 93 competitors, 78 men and 15 women, took part in 59 events in 13 sports.

Medalists

Athletics

Canoeing

Cycling

Four cyclists, all men, represented Yugoslavia in 1936.

Individual road race
 August Prosenik
 Franjo Gartner
 Josip Pokupec
 Ivan Valant

Team road race
 August Prosenik
 Franjo Gartner
 Josip Pokupec
 Ivan Valant

Diving

Fencing

12 fencers, 10 men and 2 women, represented Yugoslavia in 1936.

Men's foil
 Edo Marion
 Mirko Koršič
 Marjan Pengov

Men's team foil
 Branko Tretinjak, Edo Marion, Mirko Koršič, Marjan Pengov, Aleksandar Nikolić, Vlado Mažuranić

Men's épée
 Vladimir Mažuranić
 Krešo Tretinjak

Men's sabre
 Pavao Pintarić
 Milivoj Radović
 Krešo Tretinjak

Men's team sabre
 Krešo Tretinjak, Milivoj Radović, Eugen Jakobčič, Edo Marion, Pavao Pintarić

Women's foil
 Margit Kristian
 Ivka Tavčar

Gymnastics

Rowing

Yugoslavia had 14 rowers participate in five out of seven rowing events in 1936.

 Men's single sculls
 Davor Jelaska

 Men's double sculls
 Vid Fašaić
 Drago Matulaj

 Men's coxed pair
 Ivo Fabris
 Elko Mrduljaš
 Pavao Ljubičić (cox)

 Men's coxed four
 Stipe Krnčević
 Rade Sunara
 Vice Jurišić
 Ćiril Ban
 Pavao Ljubičić (cox)

 Men's eight
 Leonardo Bujas
 Rade Sunara
 Vice Jurišić
 Marjan Zaninović
 Ante Krnčević
 Špiro Grubišić
 Stipe Krnčević
 Ćiril Ban
 Pavao Ljubičić (cox)

Sailing

Shooting

One shooter represented Yugoslavia in 1936.

25 m rapid fire pistol
 Lazar Jovanović

Swimming

Water polo

Wrestling

Art competitions

References

External links
Official Olympic Reports
International Olympic Committee results database

Nations at the 1936 Summer Olympics
1936
Summer Olympics